Stanford University School of Medicine is the medical school of Stanford University and is located in Stanford, California. It traces its roots to the Medical Department of the University of the Pacific, founded in San Francisco in 1858. This medical institution, then called Cooper Medical College, was acquired by Stanford in 1908. The medical school moved to the Stanford campus near Palo Alto, California, in 1959.

The School of Medicine, along with Stanford Health Care and Lucile Packard Children's Hospital, is part of Stanford Medicine. Stanford Health Care was ranked the fourth best hospital in California (behind UCLA Medical Center, Cedars-Sinai Medical Center, and UCSF Medical Center, respectively).

History

In 1855, Illinois physician Elias Samuel Cooper moved to San Francisco in the wake of the California Gold Rush. In cooperation with the University of the Pacific (also known as California Wesleyan College), Cooper established the Medical Department of the University of the Pacific, the first medical school on the West Coast, in 1858, on Mission Street near 3rd Street in San Francisco. However, in 1862 Cooper died, and without his leadership, the Medical Department of the University of the Pacific became moribund.

In 1870, Cooper's nephew, Levi Cooper Lane, reactivated and reorganized the University of the Pacific's medical department, and, in 1882, Lane donated a new building at the intersection of Webster and Sacramento Streets and established the department as a separate school, the Cooper Medical College. Lane built a hospital and a nursing school and made provision for the creation of Lane Medical Library.

In 1908, Cooper Medical College was deeded to Stanford University as a gift. It became Stanford's medical institution, initially called the Stanford Medical Department and later the Stanford University School of Medicine.  In the 1950s, the Stanford Board of Trustees decided to move the school to the Stanford main campus near Palo Alto. The move was completed in 1959. The San Francisco medical campus became Presbyterian Hospital and later California Pacific Medical Center.

In the 1980s, the Medical Center launched a major expansion program. A new hospital was added in 1989 with 20 new operating rooms, state of the art intensive care and inpatient units, and other technological additions. The Beckman Center for Molecular and Genetic Medicine opened in May 1989 as an interdisciplinary center focusing on the molecular and genetic basis of disease. The Lucile Packard Children's Hospital was completed in 1991, adding even more diversity to Stanford Medicine.

In the early years of the 21st century, the School of Medicine underwent rapid construction to further expand teaching and clinical opportunities. The Li Ka Shing Center for Learning and Knowledge opened in 2010; it serves as the gateway to the School of Medicine as well as providing a new model of medical education by combining biomedical research with clinical education and information technology. The Lorry I. Lokey Stem Cell Research Building also opened in 2010; it is the largest stem cell and regenerative medicine facility in North America. The Stem Cell Research Building is the first of the planned Stanford Institutes of Medicine. In addition to research facilities, it houses offices for faculty from the Stanford Cancer Center and "hotel space" offices for visiting researchers.

Academic programs and students
The School of Medicine has reversed the traditional teaching method of classroom time being reserved for lectures and problem-solving exercises being completed outside of school as homework; with funding from the Robert Wood Johnson Foundation, school leaders are heading up a collaboration on the use of the "flipped classroom" approach to content delivery.

The School of Medicine also has a long history of educating physician assistants (PAs). Stanford University partnered with Foothill College in 1971 to form the Primary Care Associate Program (PCAP) which has graduated more than 1,500 PAs. The last PCAP class graduated in 2018. Today, the Stanford School of Medicine offers a Master of Science in PA Studies program that seeks to train highly qualified clinical PAs who can practice in any area of medicine and also be leaders in community health, research, and medical education. The program offers a novel approach to curriculum delivery and expanded clinical opportunities as well as interprofessional education, with PA students taking courses side by side with MD students. The program is 30 months in length, accepts 27 students each year, has an acceptance rate of less than 2%.

Rankings and admissions

In the 2021 U.S. News & World Report rankings, Stanford was ranked fourth in the nation among medical schools for research. Admission to the MD program at Stanford is highly competitive: in 2019, 6,894 people applied, 422 were interviewed, and 175 accepted for 90 spots.

Stanford is one of several schools in the United States to use the multiple mini-interview system, developed at McMaster University Medical School in Canada, to evaluate candidates.

Along with the School of Humanities and Science, the Stanford School of Medicine also runs the Biosciences PhD Program, which was ranked first in 2019 among graduate programs in the biological sciences by U.S. News & World Report. In its graduate school specialties, according to U.S. News for 2019, Stanford is #1 in genetics, genomics, and bioinformatics, #1 in neuroscience and neurobiology, #1 in cell biology, #3 in biochemistry, biophysics, and structural biology, and #4 in ecology and evolutionary biology.

Faculty

The School of Medicine has 1,948 full-time faculty. There have been eight Nobel Prize winners over the past six decades, and among its 2019 faculty members are:

 37 members of the National Academy of Sciences
 49 members of the National Academy of Medicine
 4 MacArthur Foundation “geniuses”
 15 Howard Hughes Medical Institute investigators
 26 National Institutes of Health Innovator and Young Innovator Awards

Notable alumni
 Lori Alvord – First board-certified female Diné surgeon, author of The Scalpel and the Silver Bear and 2013 nominee for U.S. Surgeon General
 John C. Baldwin – Former dean of Dartmouth Medical School and former president of the Texas Tech University Health Sciences Center
 Cheri Blauwet – Professional cyclist, winner of Boston Marathon
 William Brody – President of the Salk Institute and former President of Johns Hopkins University
 David D. Burns – Psychiatrist and author
 Amy Chow – Olympic gold medalist
 Alexander A. Clerk – Psychiatrist and sleep medicine specialist
 Toby Freedman – Aerospace Medical Director/Sports Medicine (LA Rams and LA Lakers)
 Bill Frist – Cardiothoracic Surgery Fellow; United States Senator, former presidential candidate
 Randall B. Griepp – Cardiothoracic surgeon who collaborated with Norman Shumway in the development of the first successful heart transplant procedures in the U.S.
 Mary Halton – Physician, suffragist, and an early IUD researcher, she graduated in 1900 from Cooper Medical College.
John C. Handy – Physician and surgeon in Tucson, Arizona (graduate of Medical College of the Pacific)
Eric Heiden – Olympic gold medalist and physician
 David A. Karnofsky – Medical oncologist known for the Karnofsky score
 Robert Kerlan - Founder of Kerlan-Jobe Sports Medicine Orthopaedic Clinic
 Milt McColl – Former 49er linebacker and medical family doctor
 Scott Parazynski – NASA Astronaut, veteran of 5 Space Shuttle missions
Dorian "Doc" Paskowitz (1921–2014) – surfer and physician
 Joshua Prager – Pain medicine specialist and neuromodulator
 Mary Elizabeth Bennett Ritter – One of the first women to earn an MD in California, advocate for women's rights and public health in Berkeley, California.
 Gabriela Asturias Ruiz - Neuroscientist
 Val Murray Runge – John Sealy Distinguished Chair and Professor of Radiology University of Texas Medical Branch
 Belding Scribner – Professor, University of Washington, inventor of the Scribner Shunt
 Irving Weissman – Stem cell biologist, founder of Systemix
 Ray Lyman Wilbur – President of American Medical Association, President of Stanford (1916–1943), personal physician of President Harding
 Owen Witte – Distinguished Professor and Founding Director of the UCLA Eli and Edythe Broad Center of Regenerative Medicine and Stem Cell Research at UCLA

Notable current and past faculty
 John R. Adler – Professor of Neurosurgery, inventor of the Cyberknife
 Ben Barres – Professor of Neurobiology, renowned for research on sex and intelligence
 George W. Beadle – Professor of Biology, winner of the 1958 Nobel Prize in Physiology or Medicine
 Paul Berg – Biochemist, winner of the 1980 Nobel Prize in Chemistry for discovery of recombinant DNA
 Jay Bhattacharya - Professor of Medicine, Research Associate at the National Bureau of Economic Research, and Director of Stanford's Center for Demography and Economics of Health and Aging
 Eugene C. Butcher – Professor of Pathology, winner of the 2004 Crafoord Prize
Robert A. Chase – Professor of Surgery, founder of Stanford Plastic & Reconstructive Surgery
 Gilbert Chu – Professor of Biochemistry and Medicine
 Alexander A. Clerk – Clinical Associate Professor of Psychiatry; Director of the Stanford Center for Sleep Sciences and Medicine (1990 -1998)
 Stanley Norman Cohen – Professor of Genetics and of Medicine, accomplished the first transplantation of genes between cells, winner of the National Medal of Science, winner of the National Medal of Technology, inducted into National Inventors Hall of Fame
 Frances K. Conley – Famed female neurosurgeon known for advancing women in American medicine
 Karl Deisseroth – Professor of Bioengineering and of Psychiatry and Behavioral Sciences, pioneer of optogenetics, winner of the 2016 Breakthrough Prize in Life Sciences
 William C. Dement – Professor of Psychiatry and Behavioral Sciences, pioneer in sleep research
 Christian Guilleminault – Professor of Psychiatry and Behavioral Sciences, pioneer in sleep research, first to describe Obstructive sleep apnea
 Stanley Falkow – Robert W. and Vivian K. Cahill Professor in Cancer Research, conducted pioneering work in how bacteria can cause human disease and how antibiotic resistance spreads, winner of the National Medal of Science
 Andrew Fire – Winner of the 2006 Nobel Prize in Physiology or Medicine
 Thomas J. Fogarty – Clinical Professor of Surgery, member of National Inventors Hall of Fame, owner of more than 100 surgical patents, including the Fogarty balloon catheter
 Ralph S. Greco – Johnson and Johnson Distinguished Professor, Emeritus of Surgery at Stanford University School of Medicine
 Philip Hanawalt – Hertzstein Professor of Biology and Dermatology, discovered transcription coupled repair of DNA
 Griffith R. Harsh – Vice Chair of the Stanford Department of Neurosurgery and Director of the Stanford Brain Tumor Center, spouse of Meg Whitman
 Leonard Herzenberg – Winner of the Kyoto Prize for development of fluorescent-activated cell sorting
 Henry S. Kaplan – Pioneer in radiation therapy for cancer, inventor of the first linear accelerator in the Western hemisphere
Jennifer L. Kelsey – Expert in epidemiology of musculoskeletal disorders, former Chief of Epidemiology
 Brian Kobilka – Professor of Molecular and Cellular Physiology, winner of the 2012 Nobel Prize in Chemistry
 Arthur Kornberg – Winner of the 1959 Nobel Prize in Physiology or Medicine (with Severo Ochoa) for discovery of the mechanisms of the biological synthesis of RNA and DNA
 Roger Kornberg – Winner of the 2006 Nobel Prize in Chemistry, discoverer of nucleosome and transcriptional mediator, member of National Academy of Sciences
 William Langston – Founder and chief executive officer of the Parkinson's Institute and Clinical Center in Sunnyvale, California
 Michael Levitt – Winner of the 2013 Nobel Prize in Chemistry
 Joshua Lederberg – Founder of the Stanford department of genetics, co-recipient of 1958 Nobel Prize in Physiology or Medicine
 Donald Laub – Founder of ReSurge International
 Kate Lorig – Director of the Stanford Patient Education Research Center
 Alex Macario - Professor of Anesthesiology 
Yvonne Maldonado – COVID-19 research
Judith Graham Pool — Discovered cryoprecipitate, founded and chaired the Professional Women of Stanford University Medical School, founding member and co-president of the Association for Women in Science
 Daria Mochly-Rosen – George D. Smith Professor for Translational Medicine
 Stephen Quake – Professor and co-chair of Bioengineering, founder of Fluidigm Corp, Helicos Biosciences, inventor of non-invasive prenatal diagnostics by sequencing, winner of Lemelson-MIT Prize
 Bruce Reitz – Performed first combined adult human heart-lung transplant
 Robert Sapolsky – Famous neuroscientist and Professor of Neurology, most noted for his studies on stress
 Lucy Shapiro – Professor of Developmental Biology, winner of the National Medal of Science
 Norman Shumway – Heart transplant pioneer, performed first heart transplant in the United States
Lyman Maynard Stowe – former Stanford Associate Dean of Academic Affairs and first dean of the University of Connecticut School of Medicine
 Lubert Stryer – National Medal of Science recipient, Winzer Professor of Neurobiology, author of biochemistry textbook
 Samuel Strober – former chief of the Division of Immunology and Rheumatology, co-founder of Dendreon
 Thomas C. Südhof – Winner of the 2013 Nobel Prize in Physiology or Medicine
 Edward Tatum – Co-winner of the 1958 Nobel Prize in Physiology or Medicine
 Jared Tinklenberg – Professor of Psychiatry and Behavioral Sciences
 Irving Weissman – Leading stem cell biologist, director of the Stanford Institute for Stem Cell Biology and Regenerative Medicine, founder of Systemi
 Andrew Huberman

References

External links
 

Medicine, School of
Medical schools in California
Educational institutions established in 1908
1908 establishments in California